Quruq (also Romanized as Qūrūq; also known as Ghooroogh, Kuruk, and Qorūq) is a village in Rahal Rural District, in the Central District of Khoy County, West Azerbaijan Province, Iran. At the 2006 census, its population was 1,487, in 396 families.

References 

Populated places in Khoy County